Roy V. Livingston (February 2, 1906-August, 1967) was an American Film Editor. His credits include Hell to Eternity and Bomba and the Hidden City.

Selected filmography
 Dangerous Holiday (1937)
Robin Hood of Monterey (1947)
 King of the Bandits (1947)
 Jiggs and Maggie in Jackpot Jitters (1949)
 Forgotten Women (1949)
 Jiggs and Maggie Out West (1950)
 Hot Rod (1950)
 The Road Hustlers (1968)

External links 

American film editors
1906 births
1967 deaths
People from Fannin County, Texas